Pic de Serra Gallinera is a mountain of Pyrénées-Orientales, Occitanie, France.

Geography of Pyrénées-Orientales
Mountains of the Pyrenees